White Hall is an unincorporated community which straddles Baltimore and Harford counties, Maryland, United States. The town's post office is located on the NCR Trail and the Gunpowder River. Ivory Mills was listed on the National Register of Historic Places in 1997.

References

Unincorporated communities in Baltimore County, Maryland
Unincorporated communities in Maryland